Buck Jam Tonic is a double album of improvised music by John Zorn, Bill Laswell & Tatsuya Nakamura released on the Japanese WildDisk label in 2003 and consists of one disc mixed in Tokyo and another mixed in New York City. A vinyl edition was also released containing only the Tokyo mix

Track listing
All compositions by Nakamura/Laswell/Zorn
Disc one: Tokyo mix
 "Old Dragon" - 4:53
 "Lobo" - 7:18
 "Matagi" - 5:39
 "Toccata for Coyote" - 10:20
 "Nu" - 4:53
Disc two: NY mix
 "Tzu" - 23:29
 "Second Sight" - 28:37
 "Panepha" - 15:39

Personnel
Adapted from the Buck Jam Tonic liner notes.
John Zorn – alto saxophone, soprano saxophone
Bill Laswell – bass
Tatsuya Nakamura – drums

References

External links 
 

John Zorn albums
2003 albums
Bill Laswell albums